The following events occurred in June 1974:

June 1, 1974 (Saturday)
The live album June 1, 1974 is recorded at the Rainbow Theatre, London.  The main performers are Kevin Ayers, John Cale, Brian Eno and Nico.
Born: Alanis Morissette, Canadian singer, in Ottawa

June 2, 1974 (Sunday)
The African National Council rejects proposals agreed by Bishop Abel Muzorewa and Ian Smith for a settlement in Rhodesia.
Born: Gata Kamsky, US chess player, in Novokuznetsk, Soviet Union

June 3, 1974 (Monday)
The Italian Open tennis tournament ends, in Rome, with the singles titles going to third-seeded Björn Borg and first-seeded Chris Evert.
Yitzhak Rabin presents his cabinet for a Knesset "Vote of Confidence". The Seventeenth government of Israel is approved that day and the members are sworn in.
General Carlos Briceño Zevallos assumes operational command of all UNTSO Observers detailed to United Nations Disengagement Observer Force.

June 4, 1974 (Tuesday)

A lunar eclipse takes place. 
Construction of OV-101, the first Space Shuttle, begins. It later will be named Enterprise. 
Born: Jacob Sahaya Kumar Aruni, Indian celebrity chef, in Uthamapalayam (died 2012)
Died: Mamerto Urriolagoitía, 78, President of Bolivia 1949–51

June 5, 1974 (Wednesday)
Mike Edwards is drafted by the Pittsburgh Pirates in the 7th round of the 1974 Major League Baseball Draft.

June 6, 1974 (Thursday)
Born: Guillaume Musso, French novelist, in Antibes

June 7, 1974 (Friday)
Born:  Mahesh Bhupathi, Indian tennis player, in Bangalore; Bear Grylls, British adventurer, in London

June 8, 1974 (Saturday)
June 1974 Great Plains tornado outbreak: An outbreak of 36 tornadoes, at least 19 of them significant or intense, becomes the second-deadliest June tornado event in Oklahoma history, with 16 deaths reported in the state.
Jon Pertwee makes his last appearance as Doctor Who in the final episode of "Planet of the Spiders", and is replaced by Tom Baker.

June 9, 1974 (Sunday)
The 1974 Swedish Grand Prix is held at the Scandinavian Raceway, and won by Jody Scheckter. 
In the Taça de Portugal Final, Sporting CP defeat Benfica 2–1 to win their ninth Taça de Portugal.
Born: Samoth, Norwegian musician, in Hammerfest
Died: Miguel Ángel Asturias, 74, Guatemalan writer, Nobel Prize laureate

June 10, 1974 (Monday)
Died: Prince Henry, Duke of Gloucester, 74, Governor-General of Australia and son of King George V of the United Kingdom

June 11, 1974 (Tuesday)
Northrop YF-17A 72-01569 becomes the first American fighter to break the sound barrier in level flight when not in afterburner.
Died: Julius Evola, 76, Italian philosopher

June 12, 1974 (Wednesday)
Born: Lulzim Basha, Albanian politician, in Tirana; Karen Hækkerup, Danish politician and businesswoman
Died: André Marie, 76, French politician, prime minister 1948

June 13, 1974 (Thursday)
The 1974 FIFA World Cup begins in West Germany.
Born: Selma, Icelandic singer, in Reykjavik

June 14, 1974 (Friday)
Anatoli Kaplin, the first Soviet Ambassador to Ireland, visited President Erskine Hamilton Childers at Áras an Uachtaráin.

June 15, 1974 (Saturday)
Red Lion Square disorders and death of Kevin Gately: the National Front march through London's West End, while the London Area Council for Liberation conducts a counter demonstration.  A student is killed during the demonstrations, the first demonstrator to be killed in Britain for 55 years, leading to a public enquiry conducted by Lord Scarman.

June 16, 1974 (Sunday)
The 1974 24 Hours of Le Mans ends in a third consecutive victory for French drivers Henri Pescarolo and Gérard Larrousse.
The Milwaukee Road ends operation of its electric locomotives in Montana and Idaho. Trains over the Rocky Mountains are now solely powered by diesels.

June 17, 1974 (Monday)
A bomb explodes at the Houses of Parliament in London, causing extensive damage and injuring 11 people.  The Irish Republican Army claims responsibility.

June 18, 1974 (Tuesday)
Died: Georgy Zhukov, 77, Soviet general (World War II)

June 19, 1974 (Wednesday)
Pravda reports that Yekaterina Furtseva, the most influential woman in Soviet politics, has failed to be re-elected to the Supreme Soviet, shortly after being disciplined by the Party for extravagance and fined 40,000 rubles.  Furtseva died four months later.

June 20, 1974 (Thursday)
The remains of 17th-century naval vessel , on the low water mark of the beach near Pett Level, East Sussex, are designated under the  British Protection of Wrecks Act.

June 21, 1974 (Friday)
Károly Polinszky becomes Hungary's Minister of Education.

June 22, 1974 (Saturday)
A silent march retraces the route of the previous week's Liberation counter-demonstration from London's embankment to Red Lion Square, in memory of Kevin Gately.
Died: Darius Milhaud, 81, French composer

June 23, 1974 (Sunday)
The Austrian presidential election, brought about by the death of Franz Jonas, results in Foreign Minister Rudolf Kirchschläger being elected with a share of 51.7% of the vote.

June 24, 1974 (Monday)
The Shtyki Memorial, near Zelenograd in the Soviet Union, is completed; it is part of a memorial complex created in honour of those who defended the country in the Battle of Moscow. 
The 88th Wimbledon tennis championships open in London.

June 25, 1974 (Tuesday)
Born: Karisma Kapoor, Indian actress, daughter of Randhir Kapoor and Babita, in Mumbai

June 26, 1974 (Wednesday)
The Universal Product Code is scanned for the first time, to sell a package of Wrigley's chewing gum at the Marsh Supermarket in Troy, Ohio, the first use of barcode technology in American retailing.
Born: Derek Jeter, American baseball player

June 27, 1974 (Thursday)
The 61st Tour de France begins at Brest.

June 28, 1974 (Friday)
In response to protests by the imperial regime, a new Coordinating Committee of the Armed Forces (which becomes the Derg) seizes the radio station in Addis Ababa, and begin to arrest other aristocrats, high officials, and generals suspected of being behind the reactionary movement.
Real Madrid C.F. defeat FC Barcelona in the final of Spain's Copa del Generalísimo football competition, held at the Vicente Calderón Stadium, Madrid.
Born: Rob Dyrdek, American skateboarder, entrepreneur and reality television star, in Kettering, Ohio
Died: Vannevar Bush, 84, US engineer, inventor and science administrator

June 29, 1974 (Saturday)
Isabel Perón is sworn in as the first female President of Argentina, replacing her sick husband Juan Perón, who dies 2 days later.
Soviet ballet dancer Mikhail Baryshnikov defects while visiting Toronto, Canada, and requests political asylum.
America Sings attraction opens to the public for the first time at Disneyland in Anaheim, California.

June 30, 1974 (Sunday)
Icelandic parliamentary election, 1974: the Independence Party remains the largest party in the Lower House of the Althing, winning 17 of the 40 seats.
Died: Alberta Williams King, 69, African-American musician and church leader, shot while playing the organ of the Ebenezer Baptist Church in Atlanta, Georgia, by Marcus Wayne Chenault.

References

1974
1974-06
1974-06